The Coal Mines Regulation Act 1908 (c. 57), also known as the Eight Hours Act or the Coal Mines (Eight Hours) Act, was a piece of social legislation passed in 1908 in the United Kingdom by the Liberal government. It limited the hours a miner could work to eight hours per day.

See also
Liberal reforms

References

Further reading
 Coal Mines (Eight Hours) Act via Historic Hansard

United Kingdom Acts of Parliament 1908
United Kingdom labour law
Coal mining in the United Kingdom
1908 in labor relations
Coal mining law